Krzysztof Władysław Podsiadło (born 16 February 1962) is a Polish former ice hockey player and coach. He played for Zagłębie Sosnowiec, Antjärns IK, GKS Tychy, Cracovia, GKS Katowice, and SMS Warszawa during his career. He also played for the Polish national team at the 1988 Winter Olympics and five World Championships. After his playing career he turned to coaching.

References

External links
 

1962 births
Living people
GKS Katowice (ice hockey) players
GKS Tychy (ice hockey) players
Ice hockey players at the 1988 Winter Olympics
KH Zagłębie Sosnowiec players
MKS Cracovia (ice hockey) players
Olympic ice hockey players of Poland
People from Sosnowiec
Polish ice hockey coaches
Polish ice hockey forwards
SMS Warszawa players